James Francis Lawrence Ginty (born December 4, 1980) is an American actor. He was discovered by director Kathryn Bigelow while at the Juilliard School in New York City, and was cast in her film K-19: The Widowmaker alongside Harrison Ford and Liam Neeson. He has worked in film, theatre and television and is probably best known for playing multiple roles in Disney's sci-fi action picture Surrogates.

Early life and education
Born in Los Angeles, Ginty is the son of actor/director Robert Ginty, and American actress Francine Tacker, who met as series regulars on the late 1970s television series The Paper Chase. Ginty attended Valley Forge Military Academy and the Interlochen Arts Academy. Ginty subsequently continued his acting education at the Juilliard School in New York City as a member of the Drama Division's Group 32, which also included Jessica Chastain, Jess Weixler and Michael Urie. Ginty holds a degree in history from UCLA and a graduate degree from the University of Pennsylvania.

Career
Ginty dropped out of Juilliard when Kathryn Bigelow cast him in K-19: The Widowmaker. He went on to star in Touchstone Pictures' Surrogates alongside Bruce Willis and Rosamund Pike and directed by Jonathan Mostow. Ginty played two roles in the film, that of Dr. Lionel Canter as well as the surrogate of his son, Jared. The film grossed over $120 million at the worldwide box office.

On television Ginty has appeared in hit shows such as Grey's Anatomy, ER, Chuck, Blue Bloods, Deadbeat, and the Stephen Frears directed movie Muhammad Ali's Greatest Fight for HBO Films (nominated for a Primetime Emmy in the category of Outstanding Television Movie).

Ginty's regional theatre credits include playing Romeo in the Seattle Repertory Theatre's production of Romeo and Juliet, Bertram in The Folger Shakespeare Theatre's production of All's Well That Ends Well, and Jacob Milne in Tom Stoppard's Night and Day at Philadelphia's Wilma Theatre.

Teaching 
Ginty has worked as a professor at Fordham University in New York City, and taught history at Miss Porter's, an all-girls boarding school in Farmington, Connecticut. He left his job as a history teacher at the Chapin School in Manhattan, New York in 2020.

Filmography

Film

Television

References

External links

1980 births
Male actors from California
American male film actors
American male television actors
Interlochen Center for the Arts alumni
Living people
People from Greater Los Angeles
Juilliard School alumni
American male stage actors
American male Shakespearean actors